Carlos Seco Serrano (14 November 1923 – 12 April 2020) was a Spanish historian who specialised in the contemporary era.

Biography
He was born in Toledo, and died, aged 96, in Madrid, a victim of the COVID-19 pandemic.

Seco Serrano was elected to medalla nº 12 of the Real Academia de la Historia on 21 January 1977 and took up his seat on 5 February 1978.

References

1923 births
2020 deaths
Members of the Real Academia de la Historia
People from Toledo, Spain
20th-century Spanish historians
Deaths from the COVID-19 pandemic in Spain